A Panel of Experts is a painting created by American artist Jean-Michel Basquiat in 1982.

Summary 
The artwork in part is Basquiat's depiction of a catfight between two of his lovers, Suzanne Mallouk and Madonna.

Background 
In 1981, Jean-Michel Basquiat began dating Suzanne Mallouk, a waitress and aspiring artist he met at Night Birds bar in Manhattan's East Village. He moved in with her and she paid the rent while he focused on painting. That same year, he made the transition from a street artist to exhibiting his artwork in galleries. They moved into a loft provided by gallerist Annina Nosei on Crosby Street in SoHo in early 1982; Mallouk moved out the loft a few months later. They dated on-and-off until 1983.

In 1982, Basquiat began dating Madonna, then an up-and-coming singer working on her debut album Madonna. According to Ed Steinberg, who directed the music video for her debut single "Everybody," he arranged for them to meet at his place after Madonna spotted Basquiat at Lucky Strike nightclub. However, Basquiat's former Gray bandmate Nick Taylor stated that he introduced them during Retro Night at Bowlmor. Soon after meeting, Madonna moved into Basquiat's Crosby Street loft and they dated until 1983. One night while they were at The Roxy nightclub in Chelsea, Mallouk spotted them and attacked Madonna in a jealous rage. Mallouk also made a bonfire of Basquiat's paintings outside his loft.

Analysis 
A Panel of Experts is painted on stretched canvas. The canvas is on the base of a handmade structure; tied pieces of wood with twine. Basquiat drew some images and painted the background black, which overlaps some of the images. This creates a strong contrast and draws attention to the text and imagery.

The top left side has "VENUS" written with "MADONNA©" crossed out underneath. Basquiat referred to Suzanne Mallouk as "Venus" in his paintings. He crossed out words to bring more attention to them. "I cross out words so you will see them more; the fact that they are obscured makes you want to read them," he said. The copyright symbol next to Madonna's name suggests his awareness of her impending fame. Basquiat told his art dealer Larry Gagosian that "she'll be the biggest pop star in the world." There is humor in the painting with Basquiat depicting the catfight between Mallouk and Madonna as stick figures. According to Mallouk, Basquiat told that her that she won the fight which is why he crossed out Madonna's name, adding she "beat her up just like a Puerto Rican girl."

Growing up Basquiat wanted to be a cartoonist. In this painting he incorporates and repurposes cartoon images. Below the fight, there is a superman-like figure accompanied by the word "KRAK," relating to the comic book-style of adding onomatopoeic sound effects. The phrase "SATURDAY MORNING CARTOON" is written on the top right of the painting. On the bottom of the painting, text relating to Saturday morning cartoons are written such as "SUGAR COATED CORN PUFFS," "MILK" and "SUGAR." Basquiat's crown motif which appears frequently in his early work is also present twice.

Exhibitions 
A Panel of Experts was created for Basquiat's solo exhibition at the Fun Gallery in New York in November 1982. It is now part of the permanent collection at the Montreal Museum of Fine Arts.

In 2016, A Panel of Experts was displayed at the Vancouver Art Gallery as part of MashUp: The Birth of Modern Culture. From September 2017 to January 2018, it was exhibited at the Barbican Centre in London as part of Basquiat: Boom for Real. Madonna, who was Basquiat's date for his Fun Gallery exhibition opening in 1982, visited the Barbican and took a photo in front the painting in 2017.

See also 

 List of paintings by Jean-Michel Basquiat
 Animation in the United States in the television era

References

Further reading 

 

Paintings by Jean-Michel Basquiat
1982 paintings
Paintings in Canada
Cultural depictions of Madonna